David Peter Howe (born 1 March 1982) is a former motorcycle speedway rider from England.

Career
Born in Leicester, England, David Howe started his career on 31 March 1997, aged 15, with the Peterborough Panthers team in the Conference League.

He is a three-time Grand Prix participant, having been awarded wild card places for 2003 Speedway Grand Prix series in Britain and Slovenia. He also featured as a wild card for the 2007 Speedway Grand Prix of Great Britain, awarded to him after finishing runner-up in the 2007 British Championship.

In 1999 he won 3 Titles with Peterborough Panthers: The Elite League Title, the Knockout Cup and the Craven Shield. He won the British Under-21 Champion in 2000 and in 2002 he finished third in the World Under-21 Championship.

David was also successful in both Grasstrack and Longtrack having competed at the highest level of both disciplines and used GM engines that were tuned by Sean Wilson.

Howe announced his retirement from the sport at the end of the 2018 season.

Speedway Grand Prix

Domestic leagues 
 Great Britain
 Peterborough Panthers: 1997 – 2001
 King's Lynn Stars: 1998
 Wolverhampton Wolves: 2002 – 2005, 2007, 2008
 Oxford Cheetahs: 2006
 Scunthorpe Scorpions: 2009 – 2015
 Kings Lynn Stars: 2012, 2013
 Berwick Bandits: 2017 –
 Sweden:
 Filbyterna: 2000
 Örnarna: 2001, 2002, 2007,
 Smederna: 2003 – 2006
 Poland
Unia Tarnów: 2002, 2003
Kolejarz Rawicz: 2005

World Longtrack Championship

Grand-Prix

2001 – One G.P. (N/S Reserve)

2012 – Two G.P. 8pts (21st)

2013 – Four G.P. 46pts (15th)

2014 – Three G.P. 29pts (12th)

Best Grand-Prix Result

Third

 2013 –  Marmande.

European Grasstrack Championship

Finals

 2011  –   Skegness 20pts (6th)
 2013  –   Bielefeld 14pts (8th)
 2014  –   St. Macaire 16pts (Second)

References

1982 births
Living people
British speedway riders
English motorcycle racers
Sportspeople from Leicester
Berwick Bandits riders
King's Lynn Stars riders
Oxford Cheetahs riders
Peterborough Panthers riders
Scunthorpe Scorpions riders
Wolverhampton Wolves riders
Individual Speedway Long Track World Championship riders